Martin (The Execution) is a Norwegian drama film from 1981 directed by Leidulv Risan. The screenplay was written by Anne Gullbjørg Digranes, and Bjørn Skagestad starred in the title role.

Plot
Beneath the surface of a small Norwegian town in Western Norway hide completely different forces than peace and tolerance. It all starts with the teacher Martin being accused of being gay. The gossip spreads and also affects his cohabiting friends Kjersti and Sara. In the public eye, these three people are deviants that threaten the image of reality. In the municipal administration, two corrupt officials use the gossip to hide their own dishonesty. Martin is broken by suspicion and direct terror over the course of a few spring days.

Cast

 Bjørn Skagestad as Martin 
 Unni Evjen as Kjersti Horn 
 Nina Hart as Sara Trioli 
 Pia Bragmo as Ellen 
 Jon Eikemo as Karlsen 
 Terje Frækaland - Thomas
 Sverre Gran as the head of the social welfare board
 Roland Hedlund as the drunken man 
 Inger Heldal as Randi Olsen 
 Sigrid Huun as the charmer's girl
 Helge Jordal as the charmer
 Kaare Kroppan as a social welfare board member
 Lars Andreas Larssen as the gymnastics teacher 
 Rolf Arly Lund as the policeman 
 Hallvard Lydvo as the medical intern
 Mona Olsen as Marianne 
 Sverre Anker Ousdal as Arne Olsen 
 Amalia Palma as Bjørg 
 Janne Rygg as Kari 
 Morten Sandøy a Magnus 
 Anne Semmingsen as Mrs. Hansen 
 Kjell Stormoen as the principal
 Erik Strømmen as Ola 
 Rudi Sønnevik as Jens 
 Liv Thorsen as the waitress
 Geir Kåre Veum as Runar 
 Wenche Wefring as Carina 
 Kalle Øby as the postman

References

External links 
 
 Martin at the National Library of Norway

1981 films
Norwegian drama films
1980s Norwegian-language films
1981 drama films